The 1909–10 Williams Ephs men's ice hockey season was the 7th season of play for the program.

Season
After the mostly unsuccessful challenge to the IHA the year before, Williams only played one team from the top conference and surprisingly won the match. The Ephs continued to perform well over the course of the season, winning six of their seven games while playing only once at home. At the end of the season William's victory over Princeton could have given them a claim to the intercollegiate championship, however, Princeton played most of their games against top competition while Williams did not. The win also came in the preliminary time of the schedule when most teams weren't fully ready for play and thus was not given the same weight that a game later in the season would receive. In any event, Williams was able to claim a win over the 1910 Intercollegiate hockey champion, something very few small schools could even hope to accomplish.

Roster

Standings

Schedule and Results

|-
!colspan=12 style=";" | Regular Season

References

Williams Ephs men's ice hockey seasons
Williams
Williams
Williams
Williams